Elizabeth Herbert, Countess of Carnarvon (29 November 1752 (date baptised) – 10 February 1826), formerly Lady Elizabeth Alicia Maria Wyndham, was the wife of Henry Herbert, 1st Earl of Carnarvon.

She was the daughter of Charles Wyndham, 2nd Earl of Egremont, and his wife, Alicia. She married the Earl of Carnarvon on 15 July 1771, at St George's, Hanover Square, before he was raised to the peerage; he was then known as Henry Herbert, MP. She became "Lady Porchester of Highclere" in 1780 and a countess from 3 July 1793. In 1795 she was appointed a Lady of the Bedchamber to Caroline of Brunswick, then Princess of Wales and later, nominally, queen; she officially retained the position until Caroline's death, despite the princess's estrangement from her husband and absence from the country.

The earl and countess had six children:
Lady Frances Herbert (died 1830), who married Thomas Reynolds-Moreton, 1st Earl of Ducie, and had children
Henry George Herbert, 2nd Earl of Carnarvon (1772-1833), who succeeded his father in the earldom
Hon. Charles Herbert (1774-1808), who married Hon. Bridget Augusta Byng, daughter of John Byng, 5th Viscount Torrington, and had one child
Very Rev. Hon. William Herbert (1778-1847), who married  Hon. Letitia Dorothea Allen, daughter of Joshua Allen, 5th Viscount Allen, and had children
Rev. Hon. George Herbert (1789-1825), who married Frances Head and had children
Hon. Algernon Herbert (1792-1855), who married Marianne Lempriere and had children

A portrait of the countess and her son was painted by Sir Joshua Reynolds. She died at Petworth, Sussex, England, aged 73.

References

1752 births
1826 deaths
British countesses
Elizabeth
Elizabeth
Daughters of British earls
Ladies of the Bedchamber
18th-century English women
18th-century English nobility
19th-century English women
19th-century English people
Court of George III of the United Kingdom